

Legend

List

References

2018-19